Joseph Walker Wear (November 27, 1876 – June 4, 1941) was an American tennis player who competed in the 1904 Summer Olympics.

He was the son of James H. Wear and the brother of Arthur Wear.

In 1904 he won the bronze medal with his partner Allen West in the doubles competition.

References

External links
 profile

1876 births
1942 deaths
American male tennis players
Olympic bronze medalists for the United States in tennis
Tennis players at the 1904 Summer Olympics
Medalists at the 1904 Summer Olympics
Tennis players from St. Louis